The Somerset County Vocational and Technical School District  is a comprehensive vocational public school district serving the vocational and training needs of high school students in ninth through twelfth grades along with adults from Somerset County, New Jersey, United States.

As of the 2019–20 school year, the district, comprised of one school, had an enrollment of 309 students and 58.4 classroom teachers (on an FTE basis), for a student–teacher ratio of 5.3:1.

School
Schools in the district (with 2019–20 enrollment data from the National Center for Education Statistics) are:
 Somerset County Vocational and Technical High School, an accredited four-year high school located on an  campus in Bridgewater Township with 365 students in grades 9–12.
Diane Ziegler, Principal

Administration
Core members of the district's administration are:
Patrick Pelliccia, Acting Superintendent
Raelene Sipple, Business Administrator / Board Secretary

Board of education
The district's board of education is comprised of five members. The county executive superintendent of schools serves on an ex officio basis, along with four members who are appointed by the Somerset County Board of County Commissioners. The appointed members serve four-year terms of office on a staggered basis, with one seat up for reappointment each year.

References

External links
Somerset County Vocational and Technical School District

Data for the Somerset County Vocational and Technical School District, National Center for Education Statistics

Bridgewater Township, New Jersey
School districts in Somerset County, New Jersey
Vocational school districts in New Jersey